Sonia Blanco (born 24 April 1973) is a Spanish former basketball player who competed in the 2004 Summer Olympics.

References

1973 births
Living people
Spanish women's basketball players
Olympic basketball players of Spain
Basketball players at the 2004 Summer Olympics